Aureoumbra is a genus of algae belonging to the family Sarcinochrysidaceae.

Species:

Aureoumbra geitleri 
Aureoumbra lagunensis

References

Ochrophyta
Heterokont genera